Sphenophryne crassa is a species of frog in the family Microhylidae. It is endemic to eastern New Guinea and is known from the Mount Dayman and Mount Simpson in the Owen Stanley Range, Papua New Guinea. Common name Papua land frog has been proposed for it.

It is a common species in suitable habitat. It is probably not facing any significant threats in its remote habitats.

References

crassa
Amphibians of New Guinea
Amphibians of Papua New Guinea
Endemic fauna of New Guinea
Endemic fauna of Papua New Guinea
Taxa named by Richard G. Zweifel
Amphibians described in 1956
Taxonomy articles created by Polbot